Chimol (also known chirmol and chismol) is a common Central American cuisine or condiment topping on foods such as carne asada.

Preparation 

Chimol is made of diced tomato, onion, cilantro, and bell pepper. It is seasoned with vinegar, lemon juice, salt, and black pepper. It usually has a spice of some sort. 
Modifications to the recipe exist depending on different regions of Central America.

Uses 
It is tradition to  cook the tomato at the same time as the carne asada, because this gives the carna asada a juicy taste. It is used as a sauce on carna asada, with salads, with pork and with chicken breast.

References

Links
Chirmol|Chismol|Chimol radish - google.com/search

Guatemalan cuisine
Honduran cuisine
Salvadoran cuisine
Condiments